Te Roto (literally, "The Lake") is a small settlement on Chatham Island, in New Zealand's Chatham Islands group. It is located close to the northern end of Petre Bay, 12 kilometres north of Waitangi. A small lake of the same name is located nearby.

References

Populated places in the Chatham Islands
Chatham Island
Populated lakeshore places in New Zealand